The Turkey women's national handball team is the national handball team of Turkey for women and is managed by the Turkey Handball Federation.

The team achieved second place in Mediterranean Games in 2009 and championship in Islamic Solidarity Games in 2022. The team is being coached by Costică Buceschi from Romania in 2023.

Notable former members

Coaches 
  Péter Kovács (born 1955), head coach (2007-2010)

Players

References

External links
Official website
IHF profile

Women's national handball teams
National women's
Handball